John Thurman Field is a stadium in Modesto, California.  It is primarily used for baseball, and is the home field of the Modesto Nuts minor league baseball team of the California League.  It was built in 1955 and holds 4,000 people. It was later named for California State Assemblyman John E. Thurman, from Modesto.

History
Originally named Del Webb Field, the Modesto ballpark was renamed for state assemblyman John Thurman in 1983 and underwent over $3.93 million worth of renovations prior to the start of the  1997 to keep it up to California League standards.

Notable events
On April 7, 2007, left-hander Randy Johnson made an appearance for the Arizona Diamondbacks affiliate, then called the Visalia Oaks. Johnson's appearance sparked a media frenzy and helped the Nuts draw over 5,000 fans for that day's game.
On June 22, 2019, it was the first Mexican Concert which was performed by Regulo Caro, Ramon Ayala and Banda El Recodo

References

External links
Modesto Nuts: John Thurman Field
City of Modesto: John Thurman Field
John Thurman Field Views - Ball Parks of the Minor Leagues

Minor league baseball venues
Baseball venues in California
California League ballparks